Eois nigrinotata is a moth in the  family Geometridae. It is found in Peru.

The wingspan is about 26 mm. The forewings are pale yellow, the veins and finer lines marked by orange-red scales. The hindwings have less distinct markings.

References

Moths described in 1907
Taxa named by William Warren (entomologist)
Eois
Moths of South America